Podklanec is a small settlement south of Žiri in the Upper Carniola region of Slovenia. It lies at the end of a valley where Black Creek and Sovra Creek meet to become the Poljane Sora River.

References

External links

Podklanec on Geopedia

Populated places in the Municipality of Žiri